Acacia anastomosa, also known as Carson River wattle, is a shrub belonging to the genus Acacia and the subgenus Juliflorae that is endemic to north western Australia.

Description
It has smooth brown coloured bark and angled glabrous branchlets that are dark red when immature and age to a grey colour. Like most species of Acacia it has phyllodes rather than true leaves. The evergreen phyllodes have a narrowly elliptic or occasionally obovate shape and are mostly dimidiate with straight or slightly convex lower margin. The seed pods that form after flowering have a narrowly oblong to narrowly oblanceolate shape that is narrowed towards the base.

Distribution
It is native to a small area in the Kimberley region of Western Australia found to the south of Kalumburu. The shrub grows on red volcanic soils as a part of open woodland communities associated with Eucalyptus tectifica, Corymbia greeniana and Erythrophleum chlorostachys.

See also
List of Acacia species

References

anastomosa
Acacias of Western Australia
Plants described in 2013
Taxa named by Bruce Maslin
Taxa named by Russell Lindsay Barrett
Taxa named by Matthew David Barrett